Gerardo Miguel Bravo Benavides (born December 22, 1981 in Lima) is a Peruvian retired footballer.

Career

College and amateur
Bravo moved with his family from his native Peru to the United States as a teenager, settling in Sylmar, California. He played college soccer at Los Angeles Mission College from 2006 to 2009. He also played briefly with the San Fernando Valley Quakes in the USL Premier Development League in 2007.

Professional
After playing and coaching for several years in various Los Angeles-area amateur leagues, Bravo turned professional when he signed with the expansion Los Angeles Blues of the new USL Professional League in February 2010. He made his professional debut - and scored his first professional goal - on April 15, 2011 in a 3-0 victory over Sevilla Puerto Rico

Personal
Gerardo's brother, Jhonny Bravo, is also a professional soccer player.

References

1981 births
Living people
Footballers from Lima
Association football midfielders
Peruvian footballers
San Fernando Valley Quakes players
Orange County SC players
USL League Two players
USL Championship players
People from Sylmar, Los Angeles